Martin Penc (born 21 May 1957) is a retired cyclist from Czechoslovakia. He finished in eighth and third place in the 4000 m individual and team pursuit, respectively, at the 1980 Summer Olympics. He missed the 1984 Summer Olympics due to their boycott by Czechoslovakia and competed in the Friendship Games instead, winning a silver medal in the individual points race. He won three medals at world championships in 1981, 1985 and 1989 in the team pursuit and points race.

References

1957 births
Living people
Czech male cyclists
Czechoslovak male cyclists
Olympic cyclists of Czechoslovakia
Cyclists at the 1980 Summer Olympics
Olympic medalists in cycling
Olympic bronze medalists for Czechoslovakia
Medalists at the 1980 Summer Olympics
Sportspeople from Prague